The Shipley by-election was a parliamentary by-election for the British House of Commons constituency of Shipley on 6 November 1930.

Vacancy
The by-election was caused by the death of the sitting Labour MP, William Mackinder on 8 September 1930. He had been MP here since winning the seat from the Liberal Party in 1923.

Election history
The result at the last General election was

Candidates
The constituency Labour party selected as their candidate to defend the seat William Albert Robinson from Liverpool. He had contested Liverpool Exchange at the 1929 general election. He was the political secretary of the National Union of Distributive and Allied Workers. 
The local Conservative Association chose as their candidate, 42-year-old James Horace Lockwood. He was a strong advocate of safeguarding for the textile industry. He had not stood for parliament before.
The local Liberals put forward as their candidate, Arthur Davy. He had contested Shipley for the Liberal party at the 1922 general election when he polled 22% of the vote, finishing third behind the victorious National Liberal candidate. 
The Communist party decided to intervene in the election and fielded 49-year-old Willie Gallacher from Scotland. He had previously stood at Dundee in 1922 and 1923 and West Fife in 1929.

Campaign
Polling day was set for 6 November 1930, nearly two months after the death of the previous MP, allowing for an unusually long campaign.

Result
The Conservative party, which had never before won Shipley, gained the seat from Labour;

Aftermath
Lockwood was re-elected at the 1931 general election, but the local Conservative Association did not re-adopt him as their candidate for the 1935 election. He stood instead as an Independent Conservative, but lost his seat, finishing last of 4 candidates with only 13.5% of the votes. Robinson challenged again in 1931 before being elected for St Helens in 1935. Gallacher returned to Scotland and was eventually elected to represent West Fife in 1935. Davy did not stand again.
The result at the following General election;

See also
 List of United Kingdom by-elections
 United Kingdom by-election records

References

1930 elections in the United Kingdom
1930 in England
November 1930 events
Shipley, West Yorkshire
By-elections to the Parliament of the United Kingdom in Bradford constituencies
1930s in Yorkshire